Aphrodite Jones (born November 27, 1958) is an American author, reporter, and television producer.

Jones is an executive producer and the host of the television series True Crime with Aphrodite Jones. Previously, Jones hosted a show called The Justice Hunters for USA Network, and was a crime reporter for Fox News, covering the trials of Scott Peterson, Michael Jackson, and Dennis Rader for The O'Reilly Factor and Geraldo At Large.

Early life 
Jones was born in Chicago, Illinois to Captain Ashton Blair Jones Jr. and Maria Kalloumenous. Jones' father served as a communications and tactical officer during World War II, served in the Korean War, and later was the Director of the Navy Material Laboratory in Brooklyn, New York, where he met and married Maria. The couple had two girls, Aphrodite and Janet. Ashton received the title of Rear Admiral when he retired from the Navy.

Career and education 
While attending UCLA, Jones appeared in two episodes of Match Game '78. During the first episode she mentioned that her grandmother was also named Aphrodite.  After graduating, Jones worked as a celebrity beat reporter for United Features Syndicate.

In 1992, Jones was teaching English at Cumberland College in Williamsburg, Kentucky when she published her first book, The FBI Killer, about Mark Putnam, the first active FBI agent convicted of homicide. The book was the source material for the 1994 made-for-television film Betrayed by Love, starring Patricia Arquette and Steven Weber.

Jones' second book, Cruel Sacrifice, chronicled the 1992 murder of Indiana teenager Shanda Sharer by four other teen-aged girls. The book's subject matter cost Jones her job at Cumberland College, a conservative Baptist institution. Cruel Sacrifice was on The New York Times Best Seller List for three months in 1994.

In 1996, Jones published All She Wanted, based on the final weeks in the life of Brandon Teena, who was raped and murdered in 1993. The book was initially meant to provide the source material for the Academy Award-winning film Boys Don't Cry, starring Hilary Swank, but the film was rewritten extensively, prompting Jones to file a lawsuit against its distributor, Fox Searchlight Pictures.

Throughout the 1990s, Jones appeared frequently on the talk-show circuit as a crime expert.

Jones has written a total of eight books, among them A Perfect Husband, about murder suspect Michael Peterson, which was made into the 2007 Lifetime television movie The Staircase Murders starring Treat Williams.

True Crime with Aphrodite Jones

Jones is the host and an executive producer of the documentary television series True Crime with Aphrodite Jones, which airs on the Investigation Discovery channel and debuted in 2010.

Personal life 
Jones has been married once, in 2010, to a man she wants to remain anonymous.

Jones currently resides in Florida.

Books 
 Michael Jackson Conspiracy (2007) —about the 2005 Michael Jackson child molestation trial
 A Perfect Husband (2004) 
 Red Zone: The Behind-the-Scenes Story of the San Francisco Dog Mauling (2003) —about the dog attack that killed Diane Whipple
 The Embrace: A True Vampire Story (1999) —about convicted murderer Rod Ferrell
 Della's Web (1998) —about convicted murderer Della Sutorius
 All She Wanted (1996) —about the life and murder of Brandon Teena
 Cruel Sacrifice (1994) —about the murder of Shanda Sharer
 The FBI Killer (1992) -about the murder of Susan Smith

References

External links 

Official Site

1958 births
Living people
American non-fiction crime writers
American television hosts
American women television presenters
American writers of Greek descent
University of California, Los Angeles alumni